Wolosso is a type of erotic dance from Côte d'Ivoire. The moves involved, described as involving "buttock-swinging," have caused controversy among Muslims in Guinea. Several allegations of rape have been made by young women in Conakry against men who accused them of doing the Wolosso dance.

References

Ivorian culture
Erotic dance